Gatecrashing is the second and final studio album by British group Living in a Box. It was released on 26 June 1989 and features the UK top ten hits "Blow the House Down" and "Room in Your Heart".

Overview 
Two years after the release of their debut album, Living in a Box returned in 1989. In the early part of the year, the lead single, "Blow the House Down" was released. The uptempo track, featuring a solo from Queen guitarist Brian May, became their second UK top ten hit, peaking at No. 10. The planned follow-up, "Gatecrashing" was halted suddenly when the Hillsborough disaster happened in the band's hometown. The single was shelved for a month, and subsequently peaked at a disappointing No. 36. Along with this, came the release of the album. Produced by Tom Lord Alge and Dan Hartman among others, the album peaked at No. 21, four places higher than the band's debut, and was further boosted by the release of the third single. The ballad "Room in Your Heart" became the band's third top ten hit, peaking at No. 5, matching the success of their debut hit. A fourth single "Different Air" failed to make an impact however. The album was recorded at Olympic, Sarm West and Maison Rouge Studios, London between September and November 1988.

Following the release and promotion of the album, the band embarked on the recording of their third album, but after a falling-out with their record company, they decided to part ways and the group split in 1990. The unreleased tracks made it onto lead singer Richard Darbyshire's debut solo album in 1994.

Critical reception
Nick Robinson, reviewer of British music newspaper Music Week, left mainly unfavourable overlook on this album. He wrote: "While Richard Darbyshire's soulful vocals excel, the tunes just don't leap out at you."

Classic Pop magazine revisited the album in 2017, giving it a rave review as a forgotten classic from the 1980s. It cited "Unique" and "Room in Your Heart" as standout tracks.

Track listing

Personnel 
 Richard Darbyshire – lead vocals, guitar
 Anthony "Tich" Critchlow – drums
 Marcus Vere – keyboards
 Tim Cansfield – guitar
 Nick Plytas – keyboards
 Will Mowat – keyboards
 Ian Green – bass
 Danny Cummings, Steve Sidelnyk – percussion
 John Cirkell, Pete Beachill, Chris "Snake" Davies – horns
 Lance Ellington, Mae McKenna, Maggie Ryder, Miriam Stockley, Steve Lang, Tessa Niles – backing vocals
 Brian May – guitar on "Blow the House Down"
 Hugh Burns – guitar on "The Day After Tomorrow Night"
 Chris "Snake" Davis – saxophone on "All the Difference in the World"
 Paul "Wix" Wickens – piano on "Room in Your Heart"
 Jack "Mozambique" Adams – mastering
 Chris Porter – mixer (tracks: 3, 5, 9, 10)
 Tom Lord-Alge – mixer (tracks: 1, 2, 4, 6, 7, 8)
 Chris Porter and Living in a Box – producers (tracks: 5, 10)
 Dan Hartman and Tom Lord-Alge – producers (tracks: 2, 4, 6, 9)
 Leon Sylvers III – producer (tracks: 1, 3, 7, 8)

Charts and certifications

Weekly charts

Certifications

References

Living in a Box albums
1989 albums
Chrysalis Records albums
Albums produced by Dan Hartman
Albums produced by Tom Lord-Alge
Albums produced by Leon Sylvers III